Monkey Businessmen is a 1946 short subject directed by Edward Bernds starring American slapstick comedy team The Three Stooges (Moe Howard, Larry Fine and Curly Howard). It is the 92nd entry in the series released by Columbia Pictures starring the comedians, who released 190 shorts for the studio between 1934 and 1959.

Plot
The Stooges are inept electricians who manage to electrocute themselves as well as their boss, "Smilin'" Sam McGann (Fred Kelsey). After predictably getting fired from their job by their other boss Mr. Jordan, Curly suggests that the boys take "a nice, long rest." They spot an ad for Mallard's Rest Home, and embark on their R&R trip.

Upon arrival, the boys are introduced to Dr. Mallard (Kenneth MacDonald, in his debut appearance with the Stooges) who prescribes a detailed, regimented schedule of exercise, only to be fed a "nice bowl of milk" for breakfast and lunch. Mallard then assigns two nurses to train the Stooges, which sends the boys head over heels into fits of love — until the "nurses" turn out to be men (Cy Schindell and Rocky Woods).

While the Stooges are vigorously training in the gym the following day, Moe and Larry attempt to help Curly flex his muscles by removing the individual weights, pound by pound. The weights land on the nurses' heads, knocking them cold. In their daze, the two spill the beans that Mallard is a quack, and the Stooges realize that the phony doctor is out to swindle the trio from their hard-earned money. While attempting to escape however, a vase falls on Curly's head causing him to wail in pain and wake up a sleeping guard. Moe and Larry claim to be doctors and say that Curly is their patient. This fools the guard, however, Dr. Mallard becomes suspicious when hearing about the "new doctors" and investigates and discovers the ruse. The Stooges manage to defeat him and two of his henchmen. However, while fleeing Moe and Larry are captured by the doctor and guard and locked inside the steam room. Curly cannot figure out how to properly operate the temperature, forcing Moe and Larry to break out themselves. In their efforts to escape, Curly bumps into a wealthy man with a bad foot (Snub Pollard), and is handsomely rewarded with $1,000 when he accidentally fixes it by colliding with the man and kicking his bad foot.  When Curly suggests using the money to take "a nice, long rest," Moe and Larry promptly clobber him.

Production notes
The title Monkey Businessmen is a play on the expression of 1931’s "Monkey Business”. starring the Marx Brothers (Groucho Marx, Harpo Marx, 
Chico Marx and Zeppo Marx)

Two special effects in the film were achieved as follows: a smoke tube was hidden in Larry's hand when he feels Curly's burning forehead, and compressed air pipes were used to blow Moe's hair upwards.

Curly's illness
Monkey Businessmen was filmed January 30-February 2, 1946, the first entry to be filmed after the Stooges' annual seven-month production hiatus. 42-year-old Curly Howard had suffered a series of minor strokes in early 1945, and his performances had become marred by slurred speech and slower timing. Novice director Edward Bernds had to deal with Curly's condition while simultaneously learning the ropes of directing. Understandably, Bernds hoped the hiatus would allow Curly enough time to recover from the effects of his strokes and resume his abilities as the lead Stooge.

Instead, Curly's condition had worsened. The comedian was in such bad shape that brother Moe Howard had to coach him on his lines; he can be seen nudging Curly in Dr. Mallard's office, reminding him to say his line, "I know: a nice big bowl of milk!" and to hold still while referring to him by his real pet name "Baby" which is inadvertently left in.

Bernds remembered the grueling filming process:

References

External links 
 
 
Monkey Businessmen at threestooges.net

1946 films
1946 comedy films
The Three Stooges films
American black-and-white films
Films directed by Edward Bernds
Columbia Pictures short films
American comedy short films
1940s English-language films
1940s American films